Wang Yun (137–4 July 192), courtesy name Zishi, was a Chinese politician who lived during the Eastern Han dynasty. He served in the Han government through the reigns of three emperors – Emperor Ling, Emperor Shao (189) and Emperor Xian. The highest offices he served in were Manager of the Affairs of the Masters of Writing and Minister over the Masses in the early reign of Emperor Xian. In 192, with help from the general Lü Bu and others, he plotted a successful coup in Chang'an against Dong Zhuo, a tyrannical warlord who controlled the Han central government, and assassinated him. However, later that year, Dong Zhuo's followers staged a counter-coup and seized back control of the central government. Wang Yun, along with his family members, was captured and executed.

In the 14th-century historical novel Romance of the Three Kingdoms, Wang Yun was the adoptive father of the fictional maiden Diaochan, whom he used to stir up conflict between Lü Bu and Dong Zhuo, causing the former to betray and assassinate the latter.

Life
According to Book of Later Han, Wang Yun was from Qi County, Taiyuan. His family had many members who had served as administrative officials in the regional government for generations. Wang Yun himself was an official at the age of 19, and became the Inspector of Yu Province. However, later he failed in the power struggle with the eunuch Zhang Rang. He had to abandon his position and hide himself in the countryside. After the death of Zhang Rang, the general He Jin came into power, and Wang Yun was promoted to the Gentleman of the Household and later to the Intendant of Henan.

In 190, the capital Luoyang fell into chaos following the death of He Jin and a bloody clash between the powerful Ten Attendants and government officials. Dong Zhuo, a warlord from Liang Province managed to take control of the situation and eventually placed in the throne a puppet emperor whom he held in his power. At the time, Wang Yun held the positions of the Minister over the Masses, replacing Yang Biao, and the Prefect of the Masters of Writing.

Dong Zhuo's subsequent tyrannical and cruel behaviour aroused the wrath of many. Wang Yun then colluded with several other officials in a plot to assassinate Dong Zhuo. The plan received a huge boost when the conspirators managed to recruit the help of Lü Bu, a formidable warrior serving as a general under Dong Zhuo. Bringing along a dozen men, Lü Bu cornered Dong Zhuo outside the palace gate and slew him.

After the death of Dong Zhuo, rumours spread that Wang Yun, now the de facto head of the Han central government, wanted to purge and execute all of Dong Zhuo's former subordinates. When Wang Yun refused to grant amnesty to Dong Zhuo's former subordinates, they took up arms under the leadership of Li Jue and Guo Si, who led them to attack Chang'an. Li Jue and Guo Si defeated the Han imperial forces guarding Chang'an and occupied the capital. While Lü Bu was planning to flee Chang'an before the city fell, he asked Wang Yun to escape together with him. However, Wang Yun refused to abandon Emperor Xian and remained behind. Li Jue and Guo Si's forces captured him and killed him along with his family. Some of Wang Yun's relatives managed to escape and survive; one of them was Wang Ling, a nephew of Wang Yun, who later became a general in the state of Cao Wei during the Three Kingdoms period.

In Romance of the Three Kingdoms

Wang Yun appears as a character in two chapters of the 14th-century historical novel Romance of the Three Kingdoms, which romanticises the events in the late Eastern Han dynasty and Three Kingdoms period of China. In the novel, Wang Yun devised an elaborate plot to eliminate Dong Zhuo. It involved two of the Thirty-Six Stratagems: Beauty Trap and Chain Stratagems.

In Chapter 8, Wang Yun was thinking about how to get rid of Dong Zhuo when he encountered Diaochan, a singer in his household whom he had been treating like his daughter. An idea struck him: Make use of Diaochan to sow discord between Dong Zhuo and Lü Bu, and instigate Lü Bu to assassinate Dong Zhuo. He then invited Lü Bu and Dong Zhuo to his residence for a party on two occasions. On both occasions, he asked Diaochan to perform for the guest and catch his attention. He initially promised to marry Diaochan to Lü Bu; later, he let Dong Zhuo bring Diaochan home. When Lü Bu found out, he suspected that Dong Zhuo had seized Diaochan for himself and became very angry. One day, while Dong Zhuo was out, Lü Bu sneaked into his room to meet Diaochan. She wept and pleaded with him to save her from Dong Zhuo. In the meantime, Dong Zhuo had returned and he saw Lü Bu embracing Diaochan. He was so furious that he threw a ji at Lü Bu which narrowly missed him as he fled. After calming down, Dong Zhuo spoke to Diaochan and asked if she was willing to marry Lü Bu, but she said she would rather die and attempted suicide. Dong Zhuo then believed her.

In Chapter 9, as Lü Bu became increasingly resentful of Dong Zhuo, Wang Yun used the opportunity to instigate and incite Lü Bu to turn against Dong Zhuo. Wang Yun managed to convince Lü Bu to kill Dong Zhuo, and then set up an ambush near the palace gates. He then lied to Dong Zhuo, saying that Emperor Xian wanted to abdicate his throne to him, and lured Dong Zhuo into the ambush, where he met his end at Lü Bu's hands. Later in Chapter 9, when Chang'an was surrounded by Li Jue and Guo Si's forces, Wang Yun made them promise to not harm Emperor Xian and then committed suicide in front of them by jumping off the viewing platform above the city gates.

See also
 Lists of people of the Three Kingdoms

References

 Chen, Shou (3rd century). Records of the Three Kingdoms (Sanguozhi).
 
 Fan, Ye (5th century). Book of the Later Han (Houhanshu).
 Luo, Guanzhong (14th century). Romance of the Three Kingdoms (Sanguo Yanyi).
 Pei, Songzhi (5th century). Annotations to Records of the Three Kingdoms (Sanguozhi zhu).
 Sima, Guang (1084). Zizhi Tongjian.

137 births
192 deaths
2nd-century executions
Han dynasty politicians from Shanxi
Han dynasty prime ministers
Dong Zhuo and associates
Executed Han dynasty people
Executed people from Shanxi
Mayors of Luoyang
People executed by the Han dynasty by decapitation
Politicians from Jinzhong